The 2015–16 FC Lorient season was the 90th professional season of the club since its creation in 1926.

Players

French teams are limited to four players without EU citizenship. Hence, the squad list includes only the principal nationality of each player; several non-European players on the squad have dual citizenship with an EU country. Also, players from the ACP countries—countries in Africa, the Caribbean, and the Pacific that are signatories to the Cotonou Agreement—are not counted against non-EU quotas due to the Kolpak ruling.

Current squad
Updated 1 February 2016.

Out on loan

Transfers

Transfers in

Loans in

Transfers out

Loans out

Competitions

Ligue 1

League table

Results summary

Results by round

Matches

Coupe de la Ligue

Coupe de France

References

Lorient
2015-16